Chloride intracellular channel protein 1 is a protein that in humans is encoded by the CLIC1 gene.

Chloride channels are a diverse group of proteins that regulate fundamental cellular processes including stabilization of cell membrane potential, transepithelial transport, maintenance of intracellular pH, and regulation of cell volume. Chloride intracellular channel 1 is a member of the p64 family; the protein localizes principally to the cell nucleus and exhibits both nuclear and plasma membrane chloride ion channel activity.

Interactions
CLIC1 has been shown to interact with TRAPPC2.

See also
 Chloride channel

References

Further reading

External links
 
 

Ion channels